Bernard Wilson is retired male amateur boxer from Grenada, who fought at the 1984 Summer Olympics in the men's welterweight division. He was the first Olympic Flag bearer for the island at the games. He also represented Grenada at the 1987 Pan American Games and at the 1982 Central American and Caribbean Games.

References

Grenadian male boxers
Living people
Welterweight boxers
Competitors at the 1982 Central American and Caribbean Games
Boxers at the 1984 Summer Olympics
Olympic boxers of Grenada
Boxers at the 1987 Pan American Games
Pan American Games competitors for Grenada
Year of birth missing (living people)